Beausoleil, beau soleil or variants may refer to:

 Beausoleil, Alpes-Maritimes, a town in southern France, adjoining the Principality of Monaco
 Beausoleil, a rural hamlet in the municipality of Compreignac, Nouvelle-Aquitaine, France
 Beausoleil First Nation, a mainly Ojibwa (Chippewa) First Nation located in Simcoe County, Ontario, Canada
 Beausoleil Island, an 8-kilometer long island in Lake Huron, Ontario, Canada
 BeauSoleil, an American musical group specializing in Cajun music
 "Beau Soleil" (The Killing), the twelfth episode of the American television drama series The Killing
 Collège Alpin International Beau Soleil, a private international school founded in 1910 and located in the Swiss Alps

People:
 Bobby Beausoleil (born 1947), former associate of the Manson Family
 Claude Beausoleil (1948–2020), Canadian poet and writer
 Cléophas Beausoleil (1845–1904), Canadian journalist, publisher, lawyer and politician
 Ian Beausoleil-Morrison, American aerospace engineer
 Joseph Broussard (1702–1765), also known as Beausoleil, leader of the Acadian people in Acadia, later Nova Scotia and New Brunswick, Canada
 Joseph Malboeuf, dit Beausoleil (1752–1823), farmer, blacksmith and political figure in Lower Canada
 Martine Bertereau, also known as Baroness de Beausoleil (c. 1600 – after 1642), French mining engineer and mineralogist

French-language surnames